Robert Wilder may refer to:

Robert Wilder, American businessman, environmental activist, and academic
Robert Wilder (novelist)

See also
Bobby Wilder, American college football coach